Middle Brook Hill is a mountain located in the Catskill Mountains of New York northeast of North Kortright. Streeter Hill is located west-northwest, and Fan Hill is located southwest of Middle Brook Hill.

References

Mountains of Delaware County, New York
Mountains of New York (state)